This is a list of the members of the 4th Seanad Éireann, the upper house of the Oireachtas (legislature) of Ireland.  These Senators were elected or appointed in 1943, after the 1943 general election and served until the close of poll for the 5th Seanad in 1944.

Composition of the 4th Seanad
There are a total of 60 seats in the Seanad. 43 Senators are elected by the Vocational panels, 6 elected by the Universities and 11 are nominated by the Taoiseach.

The following table shows the composition by party when the 4th Seanad first met on 8 September 1943.

List of senators

Changes

See also
Members of the 11th Dáil
Government of the 11th Dáil

References

External links

 
04